Seregno railway station is the railway station of the city of Seregno, in Italy.

The station is located on the Milan–Chiasso railway, and is the terminus of the Saronno–Seregno and Seregno–Bergamo lines.

Services
Seregno is served by lines S9 and S11 of the Milan suburban railway network, and is the terminus of the regional trains to Carnate. All these services are operated by the Lombard railway company Trenord.

During the peak hours, Seregno is also served by the Milan–Bellinzona RegioExpress trains, operated by TiLo.

See also
Milan suburban railway network

References

External links

Railway stations in Lombardy
Railway stations opened in 1849
Milan S Lines stations
1849 establishments in the Austrian Empire
Railway stations in Italy opened in 1849